Ian Gray (or similar) may refer to:

 Ian Gray (athlete) (born 1963), Belizean Olympic athlete
 Ian Gray (English footballer) (born 1975), English former football goalkeeper
 Ian Gray (Australian footballer) (1963–2010), Australian football player
 Ian Gray (Australian magistrate), Chief Magistrate of the Magistrates' Court of Victoria
 Ian Gray (comics) (1938–2007), British comics writer and editor
 Ian Gray (actor), appeared in Pickwick (1969)
 Ian Campbell-Gray (1901–1946), British soldier
 Ian Grey (1918–1996), New Zealand historian
 Ian Grey (rugby league) (1931–2009), New Zealand rugby league player
 Iain Gray (born 1957), Scottish Labour politician